Lee Jang-ho's Baseball Team is a 1986 South Korean sports drama film based on Lee Hyun-se's comic Alien Baseball Team.

Plot
Hye-sung grew up poor but he has a gifted talent for baseball. Eom-ji has watched over him since they were young. Hye-sung falls in love with Eom-ji but when she transfers to another school, they don't see each other for years. Hye-sung and Eom-ji meet again at a baseball field but she is now the girlfriend of the exceptional hitter of high school, Ma Dong-tak. Hye-sung competes endlessly with Dong-tak over Eom-ji. But he ends up with a serious shoulder injury and gives up baseball. Then baseball manager Sohn Byung-ho gathers up dismissed baseball players and forms a team. Manager Sohn puts his team through extreme training and Hye-sung returns to the baseball world. He competes once more with Dong-tak, who has Eom-ji by his side.

Cast
Ahn Sung-ki as Hye-sung
Lee Bo-hee as Eom-ji
Choi Jae-sung as Ma Dong-tak
Maeng Sang-hoon
Kwon Young-woon
Shin Chung-shik
Park Jung-ja
Park Am

References

External links
 
 

South Korean baseball films
1986 films
Films directed by Lee Jang-ho
1980s sports drama films
1980s Korean-language films